Pál Jávor (31 January 1902 – 14 August 1959) was a Hungarian actor, and the country's first male movie star.

Life

Early years
Pál Jávor (born Pál Jermann) was born 31 January 1902 in Arad to Pál Jermann, a 53-year-old cashier and Katalin Spannenberg, a 17-year-old servant-maiden. His parents, who only married after his birth, had 3 children to care for, which made life hard for the family, who moved often. His mother later opened a grocery store in Arad's Kossuth street. Jávor was a student in a state operated gymnasium, but often played truant to see movies in the town's two theatres. From very early on, he wanted to break away from his homeland, and from the simple life his mother wished for him.

During World War I, he ran away to serve on the front as a courier. He was caught and transported back months later by military police. In 1918, after working as a junior reporter for the Aradi Hírlap, he set out to emigrate to Denmark, so he could act in the Danish movies he idolized. As the state offered free train tickets to anyone who wished to leave the country, he willingly chose exile from Romania, but his ticket was revoked in Budapest.

Theatre life
Jávor, now seeking to gain fame in the Hungarian capital, went to study in the Academy of Drama. Living in great poverty, and expelled from the Academy for unknown reasons, he earned his degree in the Actor's Guild school, in 1922. Jávor acted in various theatres in Budapest, Székesfehérvár and several other small towns, but his dissolute lifestyle made him hard to work with. After being banned from the Guild in 1926, he acted in small roles around the country, and later in Budapest, helped by mentors from the theatrical world, and slowly waking the interest of the critics. He was a member of the Vígszínház between 1930–35, and the National Theatre between 1935–44.

Becoming a movie star
The opportunity to appear in movies first came in 1929, when he starred in Csak egy kislány van a világon, what was to be the last Hungarian silent film. Ironically, this was also the first one to feature voice, as technicians got hold of the technology by the last days of shooting. This allowed Jávor to sing a song in one of the scenes, which, combined with the charm and temperament that became his later trademark, secured him firm employment in the country's waking film industry. He took the lead role in the first Hungarian movie with sound, Kék Bálvány, and a smaller one in the second, Hyppolit, a lakáj, which became the first real hit among the public.

Jávor quickly became an idol of the 30s, appearing in numerous movies, but also remained popular on stage. The sudden fame weighed heavily on the young actor, leading to him returning to alcohol, and to frequent clashes with co-workers and the then-powerful newspaper owners, resulting in numerous scandals. His life was eased when he met and, in 1934, married Olga Landesmann, a Jewish widow with two children, who provided him with a welcoming home and family.

During the war
After 1940, World War II slowly became the part of life for Hungarian citizens and the theatre world alike, working conditions became increasingly harsher, which Jávor could hardly bear. Being anxious about the regulation of the theatre, and the defaming of fellow actors, he often clashed with superiors. Charged with making unlawful political comments, he became the target of the Gestapo. After hiding in Balatonfüred and Agárd, he returned to Budapest, thinking that the danger of arrest was over. After another quarrel with the Actor's Guild's manager, the Guild suspended him from practicing the profession, and  also banned his movies.

After the German invasion of Hungary, he was arrested by Arrow party members. Jávor was first held in the prison of Sopronkőhida under dire conditions, then transported to Germany. After being liberated by Allied forces, he awaited for the end of the war in Tann and Pfarrkirchen. His confinement lasted over nine months, about which he wrote a recollection published in 1946.

After the war he found that the theatre world had largely rejected him, offering him only a few roles. The intellectual and cultural cleansing of the new Communist government leaving him virtually no possibilities. Between July and August, 1946, Jávor made a successful tour of Romania, and then on 15 October, answering several calls, travelled to the United States.

Living in the United States
After arriving in the United States, he was met with great acclaim by the emigrant community, but despite this, he could only arrange small comedic and musical shows, which he found humiliating. Slowly sinking into depression and reaching again for alcohol, the quality of his shows also sank, emptying audience seats. While he thought about returning home, he received no encouraging news from Hungary, and the increasingly tense political situation also forced him to remain in the States. He traveled to Hollywood to seek film roles, but his limited English left him few possibilities. His best known Hollywood role is probably the small part of opera baritone Antonio Scotti in the hit film The Great Caruso (1951), starring Mario Lanza.

With humiliating castings and low ranking roles he found degrading, Jávor joined a touring group, performing Hungarian hit songs. Later he also worked part-time as a gatekeeper, and computer operator. During his 11 years in the US, Jávor met numerous difficulties, but also remembered joyful moments: he wrote numerous articles in American-Hungarian papers, and with his journalist ID he could visit movie theatres for free. Through a voluntary detoxication cure, he gave up alcohol-addiction, and befriended several emigrant artists living in the United States, including Sándor Márai.

Final years
In 1956, touring Israel with an occasional group, he learnt that he could finally go home - which he did in 1957, awaited by friends, and jobs in the Jókai and Petőfi theatres. However, the years of hardships laid still fresh on Jávor, and several critics found his acting lacking. But his still living legend carried him on, making several successful appearances, and a movie deal.

But his health could not tolerate the high intensity life. While spending over one year in bed, the National Theatre re-hired him, and he was often visited by old friends, also resolving some grudges of the past. His state worsened and, after a seizure, he was transported to a Budapest hospital, where he died on 14 August 1959 from stomach cancer. He was 57 years old

His burial was a theatrical ceremony, his coffin followed by tens of thousands of fans to the Farkasréti Cemetery.

Legacy
Pál Jávor is regarded as one of the most influential actors of Hungarian film, a widely recognized character of his era.

Filmography

Csak egy kislány van a világon (1929)
A kék bálvány (1931)
Hyppolit, a lakáj (1931)
Iza néni (1933)
A bor (1933)
Rákóczi induló (1933)
Ida regénye (1934)
Emmy (1934)
Az iglói diákok (1934)
Köszönöm, hogy elgázolt (1935)
Csúnya lány (1935)
Elnökkisasszony (1935)
Nem élhetek muzsikaszó nélkül (1935)
Az új földesúr (1935)
Havi 200 fix (1936)
Half-Rate Honeymoon (1936)
Mária nővér (1936)
Fizessen, nagysád! (1937)
A torockói menyasszony (1937)
A férfi mind őrült (1937)
Viki (1937)
Pusztai szél (1937)
Két fogoly (1937)
A Noszty-fiú estete Tóth Marival (1937)
Maga lesz a férjem (1937)
Marika (1937)
Number 111 (1938)
Black Diamonds (1938)
Uz Bence (1938)
A varieté csillagai (1938)
Toprini nász (1939)
The Perfect Man (1939)
Halálos tavasz (1939)
Fűszer és csemege (1939)
Jöjjön elsején! (1940)
Gül Baba (1940)
Erzsébet királyné (1940)
Dankó Pista (1940)
Igen vagy nem? (1940)
Sok hűhó Emmiért (1940)
Egy csók és más semmi (1940)
Tóparti látomás (1940)
A szerelem nem szégyen (1940)
Lángok (1940)
Balkezes angyal (1941)
Ma, tegnap, holnap (1941)
Néma kolostor (1941)
Egy tál lencse (1941)
A beszélő köntös (1941)
Három csengő (1941)
Lelki klinika (1941)
Életre ítéltek! (1941)
Az utolsó dal (1941)
Egy asszony visszanéz (1941)
Az 5-ös számú őrház (1942)
Carmela (1942) 
 Yellow Hell (1942)
Estélyi ruha kötelező (1942)
Pista tekintetes úr (1942)
A láp virága (1942)
Ópiumkeringő (1942)
Késő… (1943)
Makrancos hölgy (1943)
Kerek Ferkó (1943)
Valamit visz a víz (1943)
Szováthy Éva (1943)
Fehér vonat (1943)
Egy gép nem tért vissza (1944)
Madách (1944)
A tanítónő (1945)
The Great Caruso (1951) as Antonio Scotti
Assignment – Paris! (1952)

References

Tibor, Bános. Jávor Pál. Budapest: Athaneum 2000 Kiadó, 2001. .
  – Pál Jávor in the Hungarian Theatrical Lexicon (György, Székely. Magyar Színházművészeti Lexikon. Budapest: Akadémiai Kiadó, 1994. ), freely available on mek.oszk.hu

External links
 Article on Pál Jávor from Nyugati Jelen Polgári Napilap, 1 February 2002.
 Biography on szineszkonyvtar.hu
 

1902 births
1959 deaths
People from Arad, Romania
Hungarian male film actors
Hungarian male stage actors
Burials at Farkasréti Cemetery
20th-century Hungarian male actors